A field goal (FG) is a means of scoring in gridiron football. To score a field goal, the team in possession of the ball must place kick, or drop kick, the ball through the goal, i.e., between the uprights and over the crossbar. The entire ball must pass through the vertical plane of the goal, which is the area above the crossbar and between the uprights or, if above the uprights, between their outside edges. American football requires that a field goal must only come during a play from scrimmage (except in the case of a fair catch kick) while Canadian football retains open field kicks and thus field goals may be scored at any time from anywhere on the field and by any player. The vast majority of field goals, in both codes, are place kicked. Drop kicked field goals were common in the early days of gridiron football but are almost never done in modern times. In most leagues, a successful field goal awards three points (a notable exception is six-man football in which, due to the small number of players available to stop the opposing team from blocking the kick, a field goal is worth four points).

A field goal may also be scored through a fair catch kick, but this is extremely rare. Since a field goal is worth only three points, as opposed to a touchdown, which is worth six points, it is usually only attempted in specific situations (see Strategy).

In American football, the goals are centered on each end line; in Canadian football, they are centered on each goal line.

Strategy
As a field goal is worth only three points, while a touchdown scores at least six (which usually becomes seven with a successful conversion, and potentially eight with a two-point conversion), teams will generally attempt a field goal only in the following situations:

 It is last down (third in Canadian football, fourth down in American football), especially if the offense is more than a yard or two from a new first down, and within kicking range of the goal posts (about 45 yards at the professional level).
 In the first half, if there is only enough time remaining to execute just one more play, regardless of the down.
 In the waning moments of the second half, if a successful kick will win or tie the game. In this situation, a team may choose to attempt the field goal on an earlier down or if there is still enough time remaining to execute more than one play. If there are problems with the snap or hold, the team would be then able to abort the kick attempt (kneel down, or throw an incomplete pass), and still have at least one down and time remaining to re-attempt the kick.
 In overtime, if a successful field goal will win and end the game, a team may choose to attempt a game-winning kick as soon as they get into field goal range (for example, a long pass completion that advances the ball inside the opponent's 20-yard line). In this situation, a team may just decide to try to end the game rather than risk another play that could result in an interception or fumble.

Except in desperate situations, a team will generally attempt field goals only when keeping a drive alive is unlikely, and its kicker has a significant chance of success, as a missed field goal results in a turnover at the spot of the kick (in the NFL) or at the line of scrimmage (in the NCAA). In American high school rules and Canadian football, where a missed field goal is treated the same as a punt, most teams still opt not to attempt field goals from very long range since field goal formations are not conducive to covering kick returns. Even under ideal conditions, the best professional kickers historically had difficulty making kicks longer than 50 yards consistently. If a team chooses not to attempt a field goal on their last down, they can punt to the other team. A punt cannot score any points in American football unless the receiving team touches the ball first and the kicking team recovers it (though it can result in a single in Canadian football), but it may push the other team back toward its own end.

The longest field goal kick in NFL history is 66 yards, a record set by Justin Tucker on September 26, 2021, which broke the record previously held by Matt Prater (2013) at 64 yards. The third longest is 63, originally set by Tom Dempsey (1970) and then matched by Jason Elam (1998), Sebastian Janikowski (2011), David Akers (2012), Graham Gano (2018), and Brett Maher (2019). The record in the CFL is 62 yards, set by Paul McCallum on October 27, 2001. High school, college and most professional football leagues offer only a three-point field goal; however, some professional leagues have encouraged more rare kicks through four-point field goals. NFL Europe encouraged long field goals of 50 yards or more by making those worth four points instead of three (much like Australian rules' Super Goal or basketball's three-point line), a rule since adopted by the Stars Football League. Similarly, the sport of arena football sought (unsuccessfully) to repopularize the drop kick by making that worth four points; it failed, since only one kicker (Brian Mitchell) was able to do it with any semblance of proficiency. (In six-man football, all field goals are worth four points instead of the usual three.) The overall field goal percentage during the 2010 NFL season was 82.3%. In comparison, Jan Stenerud, one of only three pure kickers in the Pro Football Hall of Fame (along with fellow placekicker Morten Andersen and punter Ray Guy), had a career field goal percentage of 66.8% from 1967 to 1985.

How field goals are kicked

When a team decides to attempt a field goal, it will generally line up in a very tight formation, with all but two players lined up along or near the line of scrimmage: the placekicker and the holder. The holder is usually the team's punter or backup quarterback. Instead of the regular center, a team may have a dedicated long snapper trained especially to snap the ball on placekick attempts and punts.

The holder usually lines up seven to eight yards behind the line of scrimmage, with the kicker a few yards behind him. Upon receiving the snap, the holder holds the ball against the ground vertically, with the stitches away from the kicker. The kicker begins his approach during the snap, so the snapper and holder have little margin for error. A split-second mistake can disrupt the entire attempt. Depending on the level of play, the ball, upon reaching the holder, is held up by either the aid of a small rubber "tee" (all ranks up to the high school level, which is not the same as the kickoff tee, but rather a small platform, and comes in either 1 or 2 inch varieties) or is held up by the ground (in college and at the professional level). 

The measurement of a field goal's distance is from the goalpost to the point where the ball was positioned for the kick by the holder. In American football, where the goalpost is located at the back of the end zone (above the end line), the ten yards of the end zone are added to the yard line distance at the spot of the hold.

Until the 1960s, placekickers approached the ball straight on, with the toe making first contact with the ball. The technique of kicking the ball "soccer-style", by approaching the ball at an angle and kicking it with the instep, was introduced by Hungarian-born kicker Pete Gogolak in the 1960s. Reflecting his roots in European soccer, Gogolak observed that kicking the ball at an angle could cover more distance than kicking straight-on; he played college football at Cornell and made his pro debut in 1964 with the Buffalo Bills of the AFL; his younger brother Charlie was also an NFL kicker. The soccer-style kick gained popularity and was nearly universal by the late 1970s; the last full-time straight-on kicker in the NFL was Mark Moseley, who retired in 1986.

Successful field goals
If there is any time left in the half, the method of resuming play after a successful field goal varies between leagues.

Missed field goals  
A missed field goal is said to be "no good" if the kicked ball does not cross between the uprights and over the crossbar of the goal posts. If it misses to the side of the uprights, it may be called "wide left" or "wide right" as the case may be. A field goal attempt may be described as "short" if it does not have sufficient distance to go over the cross bar. Some commentators will only describe a field goal attempt as being short if it appears to have been aimed correctly while others will describe an attempt appearing to lack both accuracy and distance as being both wide and short.

If a field goal attempt is missed, and the ball does not go out of bounds and has not been ruled dead by a referee, then a defensive player may advance the ball, as with a punt or kickoff.  This type of play usually occurs either during an extremely long field goal attempt, or if the attempt is blocked. A notable return of a short field goal attempt was the Kick Six, which ended the 2013 Iron Bowl. If there is a significant likelihood of a miss and the strategic game situation warrants it, the defense places a player downfield, in or near their end zone, to catch the ball. The risk in this is that the return man may be tackled deep in his own territory, at a considerably worse position than he could have gotten by letting the ball go dead (see below); furthermore, should the returner fumble the ball, the kicking team can recover it and gain a new set of downs (the advantage is that the kicking team is lined up very close together to stop kick blockers, and not spread across the field like a kickoff or punt team, and is therefore in poor position to defend the return). Thus, teams will usually return a kick only towards the end of a half (when the kick will be the final play) or in a particularly desperate situation.

If a ball caroms off one of the goal posts or the crossbar but lands in the field of play, the ball is considered dead and cannot be returned. (This is not the case in arena football, where large "rebound nets" surround the goal posts for the explicit purpose of keeping the ball in play.) However, if the ball continues into the goal after caroming, the score counts.

Situations where the defense does not return a missed field goal vary between leagues and levels of play:

Blocked field goals

Occasionally, the defense will succeed in blocking a field goal. If the ball falls in or behind the neutral zone, it is treated like a fumble and can be advanced by either team. If the ball instead falls forward beyond the neutral zone, it is treated like a missed field goal under the rules explained above.

History
In the early days of football, kicking was emphasized. In 1883, the scoring system was devised with field goals counting for five points, and touchdowns and conversions worth four points. In 1897, the touchdown was raised to five points while the conversion was lowered to one point. (In 1958, the NCAA created the two-point conversion for conversions scored via run or pass; the NFL followed suit in 1994.) Field goals were devalued to four points in 1904, and then to the modern three points in 1909. The touchdown was changed to six points in 1912 in American football; the Canadian game followed suit in 1956.

The spot of the conversion has also changed through the years. In 1924, NCAA rules spotted the conversion at the 3-yard line, before moving it back to the 5-yard line in 1925. In 1929, the spot was moved up to the 2-yard line, matching the NFL. In 1968, the NCAA diverged from the NFL rules and moved the spot back to the original 3-yard line. Canadian rules originally spotted the conversion at the 5-yard line, which remains closer than in the American code (for kicked conversions) as the goalposts are at the front of the end zone.

In , to make conversion kicks harder, the NFL and CFL moved the line of scrimmage for conversion kicks to the 15- and 25-yard lines, respectively.  (The CFL also moved the spot for two-point conversion attempts to the 3-yard line, while then NFL remained at the 2-yard line.)

The goalposts were originally located on the goal line; this led to many injuries and sometimes interfered with play. The NCAA moved the goal posts to the rear of the end zone in 1927. The NFL kept the goal posts at the goal line until 1974, when they were moved back to the rear of the end zone, where they have remained since. The Canadian game still has posts on the goal line.

The width of the goalposts and the hashmarks have also varied throughout the years.

In , they were raised five feet to  after the adoption of a proposal by New England Patriots head coach Bill Belichick.

The "slingshot" goalpost, having a single post curving 90° up from the ground to support the crossbar, was invented by Jim Trimble and Joel Rottman in Montreal, Quebec, Canada. The first ones were built by Alcan and displayed at the Expo 67  world's fair in Montreal. The NFL had standardized its goalposts in 1966 and adopted the slingshot for the  season. The NCAA subsequently adopted the same rule, but later allowed the use of "offset" goalposts with the older two-post base. The CFL was the first league to use the slingshot goalposts. They debuted in the 2nd game of the CFL's Eastern Conference final in 1966 at Montreal's Autostade because Landsdowne Park (now TD Place Stadium), the home of Ottawa Rough Riders, was undergoing renovations. They were also used in the Grey Cup the next week at Vancouver's Empire Stadium. Three schools in Division I FBS currently use dual-support posts: Florida State, LSU, and Washington State. A special exemption was allowed by the NFL for the New Orleans Saints to use the offset goalposts during the 2005 season, when they used LSU's stadium for home games after Hurricane Katrina.

Goalposts at the professional level today are sometimes equipped with a video camera mounted to the stanchion immediately behind the center of the crossbar. Since these cameras are both above and slightly behind the crossbar, a field goal attempt will be judged good if it strikes this equipment.

The NFL (and most other professional leagues) has never allowed the use of tees for field goal kick attempts, having always required kickers to kick off the ground for such attempts (and for extra points; a rare exception for a U.S.-based pro league to allow the usage of such tees for such attempts was the original USFL in the 1980s). In 1948, the NCAA authorized the use of the small rubberized kicking tee for extra points and field goals, but banned them by 1989, requiring kicks from the ground, as in the NFL. The CFL allows the use of a tee for field goals and convert kicks, but it is optional.

During the  NFL season, a record 90 field goals of 50 yards or longer were made. In , this record was raised to 92 field goals of 50 yards or longer.

Longest field goal records

According to the Guinness World Records, the longest recorded field goal successfully kicked at any level was 69 yards. It was kicked by Ove Johansson of the Abilene Christian University Wildcats in the 1976 game against East Texas State University Lions (now Texas A&M University–Commerce) in Shotwell Stadium, Abilene, Texas.

NFL
The longest successful field goal in NFL history was 66 yards by Justin Tucker of the Baltimore Ravens against the Detroit Lions on September 26, 2021. The longest field goal attempt in an NFL game was 76 yards by Sebastian Janikowski of the Oakland Raiders against the San Diego Chargers on September 28, 2008. 

In a pre-season NFL game between the Denver Broncos and the Seattle Seahawks on August 29, 2002, Ola Kimrin kicked a 65-yard field goal.  However, because pre-season games are not counted toward official records, this accomplishment did not stand as the official record, even before Tucker bested it in 2021.

CFL
62 yards, Paul McCallum, Saskatchewan Roughriders vs. Edmonton Eskimos, October 27, 2001
60 yards, Dave Ridgway, Saskatchewan Roughriders vs. Winnipeg Blue Bombers, September 6, 1987

College football
69 yards, Ove Johansson, Abilene Christian vs. East Texas State on October 16, 1976. (NAIA)
67 yards, Tom Odle, Fort Hays State vs. Washburn, 1988. (NCAA)
67 yards, Joe Williams, Wichita State vs. Southern Illinois, 1978. (NCAA Division I)
67 yards, Russell Erxleben, Texas vs. Rice, 1977. (NCAA Division I)
67 yards, Steve Little, Arkansas vs. Texas, 1977. (NCAA Division I)
65 yards, J. T. Haxall, Princeton vs. Yale, 1882.
65 yards, Tony Franklin, Texas A&M vs. Baylor on October 16, 1976. (NCAA Division I)

All of the above kicks were successful with the use of a kicking tee, which was banned by the NCAA after the 1988 season.

65 yards, Martin Gramatica, Kansas State vs. Northern Illinois, 1998 - without a tee; also the longest field goal since the NCAA narrowed the goalposts from 23 feet, 4 inches to 18 feet, 6 inches in 1991.

The longest known drop-kicked field goal in college football was a 62-yard kick from Pat O'Dea, an Australian kicker who played for Wisconsin. O'Dea's kick took place in a blizzard against Northwestern on November 15, 1898.

U Sports
The longest field goal in U Sports football history is 59 yards, by Niko Difonte of Calgary Dinos, playing against the UBC Thunderbirds on November 11, 2017.  The field goal was the final and winning play of the 81st Hardy Cup.

High school

68 yards, Dirk Borgognone, Reno High School vs. Sparks High School (Nevada), September 27, 1985
67 yards, Austin Rehkow, Central Valley High School (Spokane Valley, Washington) vs. Shadle Park High School (Spokane, Washington), October 18, 2012, game-tying FG with :02 left in 4th quarter (CV would go on to win 62-55). 
62 yards, David Rosenbaum, Woodrow Wilson High School vs. Spingarn High School, October 3, 2003.
62 yards, Russell Wheatley, Permian High School (Odessa, TX) vs Longview High School, December 13, 1975

Independent amateur
68 yards, Fabrizio Scaccia, Treasure Coast Bobcats (FL), March 29, 2009 (world record for a kick without the aid of a tee, which was banned for field goal and extra point attempts in the NCAA in 1989)

Independent Women's Football League 
 44 yards, Sarah Oliver, California Quake vs. New Mexico Menace, April 26, 2008.

Longest missed field goal return records

NFL
Field goal returns are rare in the NFL, since an attempt with sufficient distance that misses the uprights will automatically be dead. Returns are possible when a field goal is short, but in that case returners will usually down the ball so as to scrimmage from the spot of the kick. Normally, a return will only be attempted when there is not enough time left in the half to run a play from scrimmage. Nevertheless, the following five field goals have been returned for at least 107 yards in the 21st century (the record set by Antonio Cromartie in 2007, and later tied by Jamal Agnew in 2021, 109 yards, is also the maximum amount of yards that can be achieved on a scoring play):

CFL
Because the goalposts in Canadian football are on the goal line, and because downing the ball in the end zone results in the kicking team scoring a single point, field goal returns are much more common. The longest missed field goal return in the CFL is 131 total yards. Against the Montreal Alouettes on August 22, 1958, the Toronto Argonauts' Boyd Carter ran 15 yards, then threw a lateral to Dave Mann, who then returned it for the final 116 yards. This return, which started 21 yards behind the goal line, was during the era of 25-yard end zones (which made the maximum theoretical missed field return distance 134 yards in those days) and therefore cannot be met or exceeded on the modern field with 20-yard end zones. Since the shortening of the end zones in the CFL in 1986, a field goal has been returned for the maximum 129 yards on four occasions: by Bashir Levingston of the Toronto Argonauts on June 28, 2007, by Dominique Dorsey also of the Toronto Argonauts on August 2, 2007, by Tristan Jackson of the Saskatchewan Roughriders on July 14, 2012  and by Trent Guy of the Montreal Alouettes on September 23, 2012.

NCAA
In NCAA college football, only five missed field goals returns for touchdowns have ever been returned 100 yards or more:
September 17, 1966: Don Guest (California Golden Bears), 108-yard return for a touchdown after a failed 47-yard field goal attempt by Washington State.
September 28, 1968: Richie Luzzi (Clemson Tigers), 108-yard return for a touchdown after a failed 47-yard field goal attempt by Georgia.
September 7, 2013: Odell Beckham Jr. (LSU Tigers), 109-yard return for a touchdown after a failed 59-yard field goal attempt by UAB.
November 30, 2013: Chris Davis, Jr. (Auburn Tigers), 109-yard return for a touchdown after what would have been a tie-breaking 57-yard field goal attempt by Alabama fell short as time expired, what some writers and fans call the greatest play in college football history.
September 3, 2016: Brandon Wilson (Houston Cougars), 109-yard return for a touchdown after a failed 53-yard field goal attempt by Oklahoma.

U Sports
In U Sports football, like in the CFL, the longest possible missed field goal return is 129 yards, and this has occurred three times.

 Jeremy Botelho of the Manitoba Bisons playing against the Simon Fraser Clansmen on September 11, 2009
 Jedd Gardner of the Guelph Gryphons playing against the McMaster Marauders on October 8, 2010
 Tunde Adeleke of the Carleton Ravens playing against the Ottawa Gee-Gees on October 5, 2013

See also
Double Doink

References

External links
Official NFL Field Goal Records 

American football plays
American football terminology
Canadian football terminology
Articles containing video clips